Cristian Mauro Soldano (born June 2, 1976) is an Argentine former swimmer, who specialized in breaststroke events. He is a two-time semifinalist in the 100 m breaststroke at the Pan American Games (2003 and 2007).

Soldano qualified for the men's 100 m breaststroke, as Argentina's oldest swimmer (aged 28), at the 2004 Summer Olympics in Athens. He cleared a FINA B-standard entry time of 1:03.63 from the Brazilian Championships in Rio de Janeiro. He challenged seven other swimmers on the fourth heat, including four-time Olympian Ratapong Sirisanont (Thailand), who was later disqualified for a false start. With only seven left in the pool, Soldano rounded out the field to last place in 1:05.05, more than one second off his entry time. Soldano failed to advance into the semifinals, as he placed forty-third overall on the first day of preliminaries.

References

1976 births
Living people
Argentine male breaststroke swimmers
Olympic swimmers of Argentina
Swimmers at the 2004 Summer Olympics
Swimmers at the 2003 Pan American Games
Swimmers at the 2007 Pan American Games
People from Salta
Pan American Games competitors for Argentina
Sportspeople from Salta Province